Elena Libera (28 September 1917 – 8 March 2012) was an Italian fencer. She competed in the women's individual  foil event at the 1948 Summer Olympics.

References

External links
 

1917 births
2012 deaths
Fencers from Milan
Italian female fencers
Olympic fencers of Italy
Fencers at the 1948 Summer Olympics